'''Doddahosur is a small village/Hamlet in khanapur taluka in  Belgaum district in the southern state of Karnataka,India.Language spoken in Doddahosur is Marathi almost all people speak in Marathi, acspet few people speak in Kannada language.This village comes under Lokoli Gram Panchayath. It belongs to Belgaum Division. It is located 26 km towards South from District headquarters Belgaum. 5 km from Khanapur. This village total population is approx 1000–1200.Most peoples are in Farmers & Teacher and this village having school facility till 7th.

References

Villages in Belagavi district